Pol Beh may refer to:
 Pol Beh Bala Rural District
 Pol Beh Pain Rural District